Lars Theodor Jonsson (10 November 1903 – 11 October 1998) was a Swedish cross-country skier. He was two-times Swedish champion, in the 15 km in 1933 and the 30 km in 1935. He finished seventh in the 18 km event at the 1928 Winter Olympics and won a bronze medal in the 4 × 10 km relay at the 1934 FIS Nordic World Ski Championships.

Cross-country skiing results

Olympic Games

World Championships
 1 medal – (1 bronze)

Personal life 
Starting with the late 1940s, Jonsson moved to a forest hut near the city of Stromsund, living in isolation for over 40 years. Towards the end of his life, he moved to a retirement home. His hut has been preserved and moved to city's local museum where it can still be visited.

References

1903 births
1998 deaths
People from Strömsund Municipality
Cross-country skiers from Jämtland County
Swedish male cross-country skiers
Olympic cross-country skiers of Sweden
Cross-country skiers at the 1928 Winter Olympics
FIS Nordic World Ski Championships medalists in cross-country skiing
Swedish Sámi sportspeople